Williamson is a city in Pike County, Georgia, United States. The population was 352 at the 2010 census.

History
The community was named after Isaac Henry Williamson, an early settler.

The Georgia General Assembly incorporated Williamson as a town in 1908. Williamson was incorporated as a city in 1970.

Geography
Williamson is located at  (33.179743, -84.362976).

Demographics

As of the census of 2000, there were 297 people, 115 households, and 86 families residing in the town. The racial makeup of the town was 85.19% White, 13.80% African American, and 1.01% from two or more races. Hispanic or Latino of any race were 1.01% of the population.

There were 115 households, out of which 28.7% had children under the age of 18 living with them, 48.7% were married couples living together, 18.3% had a female householder with no husband present, and 25.2% were non-families. 19.1% of all households were made up of individuals, and 7.8% had someone living alone who was 65 years of age or older.  The average household size was 2.58 and the average family size was 2.92.

In the town, the population was spread out, with 22.9% under the age of 18, 11.4% from 18 to 24, 29.0% from 25 to 44, 23.9% from 45 to 64, and 12.8% who were 65 years of age or older.  The median age was 37 years. For every 100 females, there were 91.6 males.  For every 100 females age 18 and over, there were 80.3 males.

The median income for a household in the town was $34,712, and the median income for a family was $36,250. Males had a median income of $30,625 versus $21,250 for females. The per capita income for the town was $13,606.  About 12.0% of families and 16.7% of the population were below the poverty line, including 23.2% of those under the age of eighteen and 8.8% of those 65 or over.

Education
Williamson Public Schools are part of the Pike County School District. The school district has one Pre-K building (lottery funded), one primary school (K-2), one elementary school (3-5), one middle school (6-8), a ninth grade academy and two high schools.

Michael Duncan, Ed. D. is the Superintendent of Schools.

Arts and culture
Williamson is home to the Candler Field Museum, established to recreate the old Atlanta airport as it existed in the 1920s and 1930s.

Government
Williamson is an incorporated municipality and has a Mayor and City Council, a Planning Commission, and a Board of Appeals.

Steve Fry has served as the mayor of Williamson since 2009.

References

Cities in Georgia (U.S. state)
Cities in Pike County, Georgia